Enrique Tovar Ávalos was a Mexican film director notable for remaking several Universal Horror films into Spanish language versions. These include La Voluntad del muerto (The Cat and the Canary, 1927) and Drácula (Dracula, 1931).

External links

Mexican film directors
Year of birth missing
Year of death missing
Place of birth missing
Place of death missing